Betti-Cola is the 1993 debut album from Canadian twee pop group Cub. Originally released in fall of 1993, the album was remastered and re-released with bonus tracks in 2007 by Mint Records.

The album contains tracks taken from various 7-inch EPs as well as a handful of covers.  A 12-song double EP 7-inch titled Betti Cola, with similar cover art, was released at roughly the same time as the CD.

The cover art is by Archie Comics cartoonist Dan DeCarlo.

Recording
Cub recorded Betti-Cola primarily with microphones and a Digital Audio Tape machine. The album was recorded in various locations, including in Olympia, Washington, and at CBC Television.

Track listing
(all songs written by Cub, except where indicated)
"Go Fish" – 2:00
"What The Water Gave Me" – 1:14
"Motel 6" – 2:21
"A Party" – 1:18
"Flying Carpet" – 2:38
"My Chinchilla" – 1:23
"Electric Chair" – 2:33
"Nicolas Bragg" – 1:56
"Pretty Pictures" – 1:38
"They Don't" – 1:40
"A Picnic" – 1:24
"It's True" – 1:28
"Someday" – 1:44
"Cast A Shadow" (Beat Happening cover) – 2:12
"The Day We Met" – 1:34
"Surfer Girl" (Beach Boys cover) – 1:33
"Little Star" – 1:13
"My Assassin" – 1:51
"Tell Me Now" (Daniel Johnston cover) – 3:00
"Lucky 7-inch – 1:46
"Through My Hoop" – 2:25
"Leapfrog" – 2:10
"Backwoods" (Windwalker cover) – 3:14
"What The Water Gave Me" (NFA covers Cub) – 3:45

2007 Bonus Tracks:
25. "Chico" – 1:15 
26. "Sweet Pea" (Tommy Roe cover) – 1:24 
27. "Summer Samba" (Astrud Gilberto cover) – 1:41
28. "Hello Kitty" – 1:33
29. "Wipeout!(live)" (unlisted) - 0:20

Tracks 1-4, 25 are from the Pep 7-inch EP 
Tracks 5-8, 27 are from the Hot Dog Day 7-inch EP
Tracks 9-13, 17, 18, 20, 22, 23, 26, 28 are from the Betti Cola double 7-inch EP 
Tracks 14-16, 19, 21, 23, 24, 29 are unique to this compilation, though alternate versions of 14, 15, and 21 appeared on the Volcano, Pep, and Hot Dog Day vinyl 7-inch records, respectively.

Personnel
Lisa Marr - vocals, bass
Robynn Iwata - guitar, back-up vocals
Valeria Fellini - drums, back-up vocals
Neko Case - drums
Dave Carswell - drums, acoustic guitar, glockenspiel

References

1993 debut albums
Cub (band) albums
Mint Records albums